Mount Aeneas is a summit in the U.S. state of Montana. It is situated 23 miles east of Kalispell in the Jewel Basin area of Flathead National Forest.

Mount Aeneas was named after a Flathead chieftain.

Climate

Based on the Köppen climate classification, the peak is located in a subarctic climate zone characterized by long, usually very cold winters, and mild summers. Winter temperatures can drop below −10 °F with wind chill factors below −30 °F.

See also
 Geology of the Rocky Mountains

References

External links
 Weather forecast: Mount Aeneas

Aeneas
Aeneas
Aeneas
Aeneas